The Sélestat Alsace Handball is a French handball club based in Sélestat in Alsace and founded in 1967 under the name Sport Club de Sélestat before taking its current name on September 1, 2008. The club has played 22 seasons in D1 since 1990 and is playing since 2017 in LNH Division 2.

History

The handball section of the Sport Club de Sélestat was created in 1967 by Germain Spatz and was enthusiastically received by young people in Sélestat. Subsequently, this enthusiasm allowed Selestadian handball players to climb all the levels to reach the top of departmental and regional competitions and finally reach in 1972 in the French National Championship 3 (4th national level at that time). Then the team remains 12 seasons at this level, winning in passing the title of champion of France of Nationale 3 in 1979. A season after the accession in 1984 in Nationale 2, the club goes up in Nationale 1B in 1985. Finally, in At the end of an exceptional 1989–1990 season, the club realized its dream by reaching division 1 and managing to stay there. The club entered the French 1st division championship during the 1990–1991 season. In 1995, he reached the final of the Coupe de France but was defeated by OM Vitrolles, which was his best professional result to date. However, the club has won the Coupe d'Alsace 6 times. One of the smallest budgets in the LNH, the Sélestat Alsace Handball is nevertheless renowned as having an excellent training center. It is notably here that Thierry Omeyer, Damien Waeghe, Mickaël Robin, Baptiste Butto, Rock Feliho or even Seufyann Sayad were trained. Often used as a springboard for a future career, the Sélestat Alsace Handball has also enabled many players, today of international class, to make themselves known to the general public or to relaunch their professional careers like the German Volker Michel, Argentinian Eric Gull as well as Tunisians Heykel Megannem and Issam Tej, elected in the purple jersey respectively best center-half in 2005 and best pivot of the French championship in 2005 and 2006. In 2008, the club took its independence by leaving the bosom of the Sport Club de Sélestat to become the Sélestat Alsace Handball (SAHB). Then a major development for the club took place on June 6, 2011, with the creation of SASP Alsace Promo Handball, one of the shareholders and member of the supervisory board of which is Thierry Omeyer, in order to manage the professional sector of the club. Structured in this way, the SAHB aspires to offer Alsace, the East of France and all of its partners a media scene with a European dimension. Relegated to the division at the end of the 2008–2009 season, the club returned to the elite two years later. The club then evolves in the "soft underbelly" of the championship, far from both relegation and European places. The club thus finished 7th in 2012 and 8th in 2013, the third and fourth best results for the club in the league. The 2014 offseason marked major changes in the club's sports management since, in contrast to the club's usual stability, eight starts and seven arrivals reshaped the club's workforce. Penultimate at the time of the international break, Jean-Luc Le Gall, club coach since 2008 and whose contract had been extended in the summer of 2014 until June 2016, was sacked on February 2, 2015 and was replaced three more days late by Christian Gaudin. The change is not beneficial since the club finally finished 13th and was relegated to the LNH Division 2 after having played 21 seasons in the elite. If the club immediately returns to the end of the 2015–2016 season, the club fails to maintain its finish by finishing last in 2017 with a record of two wins, one draw and 23 losses. Back in LNH Division 2, he stabilized at this level the following seasons.

Crest, colours, supporters

Naming history

Kits

Team

Current squad 

Squad for the 2021–22 season

Former club members

Notable former players

  Frédéric Beauregard (2009–2017)
  Rock Feliho (2000–2004)
  Francis Franck (2003–2007, 2009–2010)
  Yanis Lenne (2015–2017)
  Julien Meyer (2015–2016)
  Thierry Omeyer (1994–2000)
  Mickaël Robin (2001–2008)
  Marc Wiltberger (1999–2001)
  El Hadi Biloum (2006–2009)
  Yacinn Bouakaz (2003–2004)
  Sassi Boultif (2001–2003)
  Abdelkader Rahim (2016–2017)
  Eric Gull (2001–2003)
  Thomas Cauwenberghs (2017–2020)
  Simon Ooms (2018–2019)
  Duško Čelica (2014)
  Igor Mandić (2021–)
  Ivan Vida (2022–)
  Volker Michel (2003–2004)
  Snorri Guðjónsson (2014–2015)
  Stevan Vujović (2013–2015)
  Radu Ghiță (2014–2015)
  Igor Chumak (2001–2003)
  Richard Kappelin (2014–2015)
  Hatem Haraket (2006–2008)
  Mehdi Harbaoui (2020–)
  Heykel Megannem (2002–2005)
  Issam Tej (2003–2006)

Former coaches

References

External links
 
 

Sélestat
French handball clubs
Sport in Bas-Rhin